Counterfeit Love is a 1923 American silent drama film directed by Ralph Ince and starring Joe King, Marian Swayne and Jack Richardson.

Cast
 Joe King as Richard Wayne
 Marian Swayne as Mary Shelly
 Norma Lee as Rose Shelly
 Jack Richardson as Roger Crandall
 Irene Boyle as Miss Ferris
 Isabel Fisher as Mabel Ford
 Alexander Giglio as George Shelly
 Danny Hayes as Bill Grigg
 Frances Miller as Mandy
 William Jenkins as Mose

References

Bibliography
 Munden, Kenneth White. The American Film Institute Catalog of Motion Pictures Produced in the United States, Part 1. University of California Press, 1997.

External links
 

1923 films
1923 drama films
1920s English-language films
American silent feature films
Silent American drama films
American black-and-white films
Films directed by Ralph Ince
1920s American films